Kaplon (Caplon, Coplyon, Caplan, Coplyan, Kaplyon, Kaplyn, Koplon, Koplen, Kopplyan)  was the name of a gens (Latin for "clan"; nemzetség in Hungarian) in the Kingdom of Hungary. The founder and ancestor of the genus was Kaplon (or Cupan), the second son of Kond, who was one of the seven chieftains of the Magyars according to Anonymus, author of the Gesta Hungarorum. The clan's original tribal area was the Nyírség, northeastern part of the Great Hungarian Plain.

The distinguished and influential Károlyi Family originates from the Genus Kaplon. The Bagossy, Csomaközy, Vadai and Vetési families were also from that clan and had spread northward, eastward and southward.

Etymology
The name probably comes from Turkic "kaplan", meaning "tiger".

Notable members
 Zlaudus (died c. 1262), Bishop of Veszprém, owner of the Tátika Castle

Sources
 János Karácsonyi: A magyar nemzetségek a XIV. század közepéig. Budapest: Magyar Tudományos Akadémia. 1900–1901.
 Gyula Kristó (editor): Korai Magyar Történeti Lexikon - 9-14. század (Encyclopedia of the Early Hungarian History - 9-14th centuries); Akadémiai Kiadó, 1994, Budapest; .

 
Hungarian nobility